Russell L. Adams (born August 13, 1930), an American author and professor. He is the Chairman of the Afro-American studies Department at Howard University, Washington, D.C.

Adams was born on August 13, 1930 in Baltimore, Maryland to James Russell and Lilly B. (Ponder) Adams. He received his elementary and high school education in Quitman, Georgia.  He received his B.A. degree at Morehouse College, Atlanta in 1952, a M.A. degree at the University of Chicago in 1954, and later a Ph.D. in 1971.

In 1965, Adams worked as an assistant professor and chair department of political science at the North Carolina Central University in Durham, North Carolina.  In 1969, Adams became an associate professor at the University of the District of Columbia.  In 1971, Adams was hired as chair of the Department of Afro-American Studies at Howard University.

Throughout his work, Adams focused on the emergence of the Afro-American studies as an academic field in addition to his long interest in cultural and curriculum diversity. Adams has published and edited several books, articles, and collections.  He is the author of the biographical reference book Great Negroes Past and Present (1963), "leading American Negroes", a series of film strips for which he received the George Washington Honor Medal (1966), and The Pursuit of Power in Black America in the Nineteenth Century:  A Study of the Emergence of Black Politically Oriented Voluntarism (1971).

Adams is a member of the National Conference of Black Political scientists, National Association for the Study of Afro-American Life and History, and National Association for the Advancement of Colored People (NAACP). He has lectured at many universities throughout the United States, Caribbean, Europe, Israel, and South Africa.

Adams is married to Eleanor McCurine and has two children, Sabrina and Russell Lowell Adams. He lives with his wife in Laurel, Maryland.

References

Contemporary Authors Online, Gale, 2002.
  The Department of Afro-American studies:  Dr. Russell L. Adams from College of Art and Science, Howard University.
  Russell L. Adams Biography from The History Makers.
 

1930 births
20th-century African-American academics
20th-century American academics
Black studies scholars
Howard University faculty
Morehouse College alumni
University of Chicago alumni
Writers from Baltimore
North Carolina Central University faculty
University of the District of Columbia faculty
Living people
People from Quitman, Georgia
21st-century African-American people
20th-century African-American people
21st-century African-American academics
21st-century American academics